Susan 'Sue' Beatrice Chew (born in Oakland, California) is a Democratic Idaho State Representative since 2006 representing District 17 in the B seat.

Education
Chew earned her bachelor's degree in biology and natural resources from University of California, Berkeley, and her Doctor of Pharmacy degree from University of California, San Francisco.

Elections

2020 
Chew was unopposed in the Democratic primary. Chew defeated Republican nominee Anthony T. Dephue with 66% of the vote.

2018 
Chew was unopposed in the Democratic primary. Chew defeated Republican nominee David L. DeHaas with 69.7% of the vote.

2016 
Chew was unopposed in the Democratic primary. Chew defeated Republican nominee Tabby Jolley with 62.6% of the vote.

2014 
Chew ran unopposed in both the Democratic primary and general election.

2012 
Chew was opposed by Greg Nielson in the Democratic primary, Chew won with 88.9% of the vote. Chew defeated Republican nominee Chad Inman and Libertarian nominee Mikel Hautzinger in the general election with 62.7% of the vote.

2010 
Chew and Loughrey were both unopposed for their primaries, setting up a rematch; Chew won the Democratic primary with 766 votes. Turnout for the general election was lower by nearly 6,000 votes than in 2008, with Chew winning with 5,591 votes (59.4%) against Loughrey.

2008 
Chew was unopposed in the Democratic primary. Chew defeated Republican nominee Daniel A. Loughrey with 64.7% of the vote.

2006 
Chew was unopposed in the Democratic primary, winning with 875 votes  Chew defeated incumbent Republican Representative Janet J. Miller and Constitution Party nominee Katherine Frazier, with 58.38% of the vote.

References

External links
Susan B. Chew at the Idaho Legislature
 

Year of birth missing (living people)
American politicians of Chinese descent
American women of Chinese descent in politics
Asian-American people in Idaho politics
Living people
Democratic Party members of the Idaho House of Representatives
People from Boise, Idaho
Politicians from Oakland, California
UC Berkeley College of Natural Resources alumni
University of California, San Francisco alumni
Women state legislators in Idaho
21st-century American politicians
21st-century American women politicians